Fort Berens Winery, aka Fort Berens Estate Winery, is a winery and vineyard based in Lillooet, British Columbia, Canada.  Located in East Lillooet, near the site of the never-built Hudson's Bay Company's Fort Berens, it is the first successful attempt at a commercial winery in the area in the 20th Century and has won numerous awards for its wines.  It is the only commercial winery so far in the newly designated Lillooet wine region, though there are established local vinyards which are non-commercial and a history of wine cultivation at nearby Fountain.  It was founded by Rolf de Bruin, who immigrated to Canada with his family in 2008 from the Netherlands with his wife Heleen Pannekoek and their family.  They chose Lillooet over the Okanagan because land values there were a quarter what they were in the Okanagan, which is the centre of the BC wine industry.  Though the winery's first commercial vintage was made from grapes and wine brought in from the Okanagan, their first bottles made from grapes grown only in Lillooet were opened on April 30, 2012.  The winery first started operations in 2009.

Wines and grapes
The winery's vineyards comprise twenty acres on the east bank of the Fraser River opposite downtown Lillooet, at an elevation of 230m, which was formerly ginseng farm and, before that, alfalfa farm and prior to that, market gardens.  Fort Berens wines feature images of burros, canoes railroads, and other modes of 19th century transportation, with a new "23 Camels" vintage featuring camels, evoking the story of the Cariboo Camels, and which is also seen locally in the name of the Bridge of the Twenty-Three Camels, which is the crossing of the Fraser River by BC Highway 99.  Current production is shown in the following list, where cited:,

Pinot Gris (275 cases)
Pinot Noir Rosé (90 cases) 
White Gold Chardonnay (98 cases) 
Riesling (175 cases)
Meritage (Merlot/Cabernet Sauvigon/Cabernet Franc)
23 Camels White (Pinot Gris/Chardonnay/Riesling)
23 Camels Red (Merlot/Cabernet Sauvignon/Cabernet Franc)

Awards
All Canadian Wine Championships, 2010, for the 2007 Meritage
All-Canadian Wine Festival, 2013:
Gold medal for the 2012 Pinot Gris
Silver medal for the 2012 Rose
Bronze medal for the 2012 Riesling
Bronze medal for the 2011 Pinot Noir
Los Angeles International Wine Competition, 2013
2012 Riesling
Okanagan Best Varietal Awards
2011 Pinot Gris

Other products
Fort Berens also sells wine-related products such as glasses and decanters and racks.  It also has a small gallery featuring  pottery, utensils and photography by area craftsmen and artisans.  Condiments made from local fruit and produce include:
Chardonnay jelly
23 Camels jelly, made from the wine of the same name
Pumpkin chutney
tomato salsa

References

External links
Fort Berens Estate Winery

2009 establishments in British Columbia
Lillooet Country
Wine regions of British Columbia